St Patrick's Church is the parish church of Preston Patrick, Cumbria, England. It is an active Anglican church, one of eight parish churches served by the Kirkby Lonsdale Team Ministry. It is in the archdeaconry of Westmorland and Furness, and the diocese of Carlisle. The church is recorded in the National Heritage List for England as a designated Grade II listed building.

History
Until the 19th century, this locality was within the large rural parish of Heversham. However, there was a chapel on the site. In 1850 the Lancaster architects Edmund Sharpe and E. G. Paley reported that the chapel appeared, from its architectural design, to have been built during the reign of Henry VII (1457–1509). The architects designed a new church. Building started in 1852 and the new church opened on 28 November of that year. It cost about £1,400, and had seating for 1,386 people. In 1892 the chancel was rebuilt by Paley, Austin and Paley, the successors of Sharpe and Paley.

Architecture

Exterior
The church is constructed in limestone with limestone dressings in the nave, and sandstone dressings in the chancel. The roof is of slate, with a stone ridge and copings. Fabric from the earlier church is incorporated in this church consisting of a window in the tower and niches in the chancel. The architectural style is Perpendicular. The plan of the church consists of a west tower, a four-bay nave with a north aisle and a south porch, a single-bay chancel, and a vestry. The tower is square, and in four stages that are separated by a string courses. The top stage contains bell openings in each face, and the tower is surmounted by battlemented parapets. At its southwest corner is a bell turret that rises to a higher level than the tower. In the body of the church, the west and east windows have four lights.

Interior
Inside the church, the nave is whitewashed, and it contains a north arcade carried on monolithic limestone columns. The chancel is lined with sandstone ashlar. Flanking the east window are two canopied niches. The stained glass in the east window is by Shrigley and Hunt and depicts the Te Deum. There are two war memorials, one by Heaton, Butler and Bayne, the other by Powells.  The two-manual pipe organ was made by Wilkinson of Kendal in 1891, and has been modified several times.

Gallery

See also

Listed buildings in Preston Patrick
List of works by Sharpe and Paley
List of works by Paley, Austin and Paley

References
Citations

Sources

External links
Church plan
Visit Cumbria – church photographs

Church of England church buildings in Cumbria
Grade II listed churches in Cumbria
Saint Patrick's Church, Preston Patrick
Saint Patrick's Church, Preston Patrick
Gothic Revival church buildings in England
Gothic Revival architecture in Cumbria
Diocese of Carlisle
Sharpe and Paley buildings
Paley, Austin and Paley buildings